Choi Ro-woon (born February 16, 2007) is a South Korean actor. He has appeared in television series such as Good Doctor (2013) and Plus Nine Boys (2014).

Filmography

Television series

Films

Variety show

Music video

References

External links

South Korean male film actors
South Korean male television actors
2007 births
Living people
South Korean male child actors
Actors from Pyeongtaek